Mohammed Abdul-Majid Reda (born 1 July 1938) is an Iraqi retired footballer who played as a forward. He represented Iraq between 1962 and 1965, earning three caps and appearing at the 1964 Arab Nations Cup.

References

1938 births
Living people
Iraqi footballers
Association football forwards
Iraq international footballers